Fábio Lopes Alcântara (born 24 March 1977 in Salvador, Bahia, Brazil), or simply Fábio Lopes, is a former Brazilian-born Hong Kong professional footballer.

Club career
He played as a striker for Eastern, having signed from Happy Valley in August 2007.

On 17 May 2018, Fabio announced his retirement at the annual Hong Kong Football Awards. However, on 4 June 2018, Yuen Long chairman Wilson Wong stated that Fabio had reversed his decision, and would become a player-coach for the club the following season. He was appointed as Assistant Manager from 15 July 2018 until 31 May 2020.

Following Yuen Long's self-relegation, Fabio joined Pegasus as a player-coach on 14 June 2020.

Family
Fábio has two younger brothers, they are both professional footballers.

His younger brother Fabrício Alcântara, who currently plays for Shatin in Hong Kong First Division since 2015. Also Fabrício was a teammate with Fábio for Hong Kong First Division club Happy Valley during 2006–07.

Also his another younger brother, Fernando Lopes, who played for Hong Kong First Division clubs South China and Sham Shui Po. He is currently playing for Rangers.

Honours

Club
Happy Valley
Hong Kong First Division: 2005–06

Eastern
Hong Kong Senior Shield: 2007–08

Yuen Long
Hong Kong Senior Shield: 2017–18

Individual honours
Hong Kong First Division Top Scorer: 2005–06
Hong Kong League Cup Top Scorer: 2005–06

Career statistics

Club career
As of 20 May 2021

References

External links
Fábio Lopes Alcântara at HKFA

1977 births
Living people
Sportspeople from Salvador, Bahia
Brazilian footballers
Brazilian expatriate footballers
Association football forwards
Esporte Clube Bahia players
Happy Valley AA players
Eastern Sports Club footballers
Yuen Long FC players
TSW Pegasus FC players
Hong Kong First Division League players
Hong Kong Premier League players
Expatriate footballers in Hong Kong
Brazilian expatriate sportspeople in Hong Kong
Brazilian expatriate sportspeople in Indonesia
Persib Bandung players
Expatriate footballers in Indonesia